Earl Greyhound is an American rock trio from Brooklyn consisting of Matt Whyte (vocals, guitar), Kamara Thomas (bass, keyboards, vocals), and Ricc Sheridan (drums). Sheridan replaced original drummer Christopher Bear just after the band recorded its first full-length album. They were first signed to Some Records but later started their own label, Hawk Race Records. Their music is heavily influenced by blues rock and hard rock bands of both the 1990s and the 1970s, and the intertwined vocals of Whyte and Thomas are a key component of the band's sound. After an EP in 2004, the band's first full-length album, Soft Targets, was released in 2006, followed by Suspicious Package in 2010. The band then went on an extended hiatus. Kamara Thomas, with backing band The Ghost Gamblers, released the album Earth Hero in 2013. Matt Whyte released the album To a Deer Outside Ithaca with the indie-pop duo Rupe Shearns in 2017.

Discography

Studio albums
Soft Targets, Some Records (2006)
Suspicious Package, Hawk Race Records (2010)

EPs
Earl Greyhound, Some Records (EP, 2004)
Ancient Futures, Hawk Race Records (EP, 2010)
Besides Seasides, Hawk Race Records (EP, 2012)

Live albums
I'm on Jupiter Waving My Arms at You: Live at the Calhoun School, Hawk Race Records (2010)

Appearances
 The premiere episode of the 2007 series, Bionic Woman, featured the song, "S.O.S".
 Their songs "All Better Now" and "S.O.S." were featured in four video games: Sony's MLB 07: The Show, EA Sports' Arena Football: Road to Glory, Madden NFL 08 and Burnout Dominator
 The song "Oye Vaya" is featured in the video games NHL 10, Need for Speed: Nitro and Shaun White Skateboarding and can be downloaded for Rock Band 2 through the Rock Band Network.
 The song "Sea of Japan" was featured in the season four finale of the television series Friday Night Lights.
 The video for "Shotgun" was included in the Beavis and Butt-head episode "Going Down".

References

External links
 Earl Greyhound official website
 [ Earl Greyhound at Allmusic]
 Review in The Village Voice
 Kamara Thomas official website

African-American hard rock musical groups
Musical groups established in 2003
Musical groups from Brooklyn
American musical trios